A Twenty20 International (T20I) is a form of cricket, played between two of the international members of the International Cricket Council (ICC), in which each team faces a maximum of twenty overs. The matches have top-class status and are the highest T20 standard. The game is played under the rules of Twenty20 cricket. The first Twenty20 International match between two men's sides was played on 17 February 2005, involving Australia and New Zealand. Wisden Cricketers' Almanack reported that "neither side took the game especially seriously", and it was noted by ESPNcricinfo that but for a large score for Ricky Ponting, "the concept would have shuddered". However, Ponting himself said "if it does become an international game then I'm sure the novelty won't be there all the time".
This is a list of Ireland Cricket team's Twenty20 International records. It is based on the List of Twenty20 International records, but concentrates solely on records dealing with the Irishmen cricket team. Ireland played its first Twenty20 game against Bermuda in August 2008, and these records date from that game.

Key
The top five records are listed for each category, except for the team wins, losses, draws and ties, all round records and the partnership records. Tied records for fifth place are also included. Explanations of the general symbols and cricketing terms used in the list are given below. Specific details are provided in each category where appropriate. All records include matches played for Ireland only, and are correct .

Team records

Overall Record

Team wins, losses, draws and ties 
, Ireland has played 106 T20I matches resulting in 44 victories, 53 defeats, 2 ties and 7 no results for an overall winning percentage of 45.45.

First bilateral T20I series wins

First T20I match wins

Team scoring records

Most runs in an innings
The highest innings total scored in T20Is has been scored twice. The first occasion came in the match between Afghanistan and Ireland when Afghanistan scored 278/3 in the 2nd T20I of the Ireland series in India in February 2019. The Czech Republic national cricket team against Turkey during the 2019 Continental Cup scored 278/4 to equal the record. The highest score for Ireland is 225/7 scored against Afghanistan during the final of the 2013 ICC World Twenty20 Qualifier.

Fewest runs in an innings
The lowest innings total scored was by Turkey against Czech Republic when they were dismissed for 21 during the 2019 Continental Cup. The lowest score in T20I history for Ireland is 68 scored against the West Indies in the 2010 ICC World Twenty20.

Most runs conceded an innings
The 2nd T20I of the Ireland series in India in February 2019 saw Afghanistan score 278/3, the highest total conceded by Ireland.

Fewest runs conceded in an innings
The lowest score conceded by Ireland for a full inning is 53 when they dismissed Nepal during the 2015 ICC World Twenty20 Qualifier at Civil Service Cricket Club Ground, Belfast, Northern Ireland.

Most runs aggregate in a match
The highest match aggregate scored in T20Is came in the match between Ireland and West Indies in the first T20I of the August 2016 series at Central Broward Regional Park, Lauderhill when India scored 244/4 in response to West Indies score of 245/6 to loose the match by 1 run. The highest aggregate involving Ireland was 472 runs being scored in Dehradun in the 2nd T20I of the Ireland series in India in February 2019,

Fewest runs aggregate in a match
The lowest match aggregate in T20Is is 57 when Turkey were dismissed for 28 by Luxembourg in the second T20I of the 2019 Continental Cup in Romania in August 2019. The lowest match aggregate in T20I history for Ireland is 84 scored during the 2008 ICC World Twenty20 Qualifier.

Result records
A T20I match is won when one side has scored more runs than the runs scored by the opposing side during their innings. If both sides have completed both their allocated innings and the side that fielded last has the higher aggregate of runs, it is known as a win by runs. This indicates the number of runs that they had scored more than the opposing side. If the side batting last wins the match, it is known as a win by wickets, indicating the number of wickets that were still to fall.

Greatest win margins (by runs)
The greatest winning margin by runs in T20Is was Czech Republic's victory over Turkey by 257 runs in the sixth match of the 2019 Continental Cup. The largest victory recorded by Ireland was during the semifinal of the 2017 Desert T20 Challenge by 98 runs against Scotland.

Greatest win margins (by balls remaining)
The greatest winning margin by balls remaining in T20Is was Austria's victory over Turkey by 104 balls remaining in the ninth match of the 2019 Continental Cup. The largest victory recorded by Ireland is during the 2019 ICC World Twenty20 Qualifier against Nigeria when they won by 8 wickets with 83 balls remaining.

Greatest win margins (by wickets)
A total of 22 matches have ended with chasing team winning by 10 wickets with New Zealand winning by such margins a record three times. Ireland have won a T20I match by this margin on two occasions.

Highest successful run chases
Australia holds the record for the highest successful run chase which they achieved when they scored 245/5 in response to New Zealand's 243/6. The highest successful chase for Ireland was in the third match of the 2019–20 Ireland Tri-Nation Series against Scotland when they scored 194/6 to win by four wickets.

Narrowest win margins (by runs)
The narrowest run margin victory is by 1 run which has been achieved in 15 T20I's with Ireland winning such games once.

Narrowest win margins (by balls remaining)
The narrowest winning margin by balls remaining in T20Is is by winning of the last ball which has been achieved 26 times. Ireland has achieve victory of the last ball on two occasions.

Narrowest win margins (by wickets)
The narrowest margin of victory by wickets is 1 wicket which has settled four such T20Is with Ireland being victors on one of those occasions.

Greatest loss margins (by runs)
Ireland's biggest defeat by runs was against India was during the India's tour of Ireland in 2018 by 143 runs at Malahide Cricket Club Ground, Dublin, Ireland.

Greatest loss margins (by balls remaining)
The largest defeat suffered by Ireland was against Afghanistan during the final of the 2017 Desert T20 Challenge at Dubai International Cricket Stadium, Dubai, UAE when they lost by 10 wickets with 73 balls remaining.

Greatest loss margins (by wickets)
Ireland have lost a T20I match by a margin of 10 wickets on one occasion.

Narrowest loss margins (by runs)
The narrowest loss of Ireland in terms of runs is by 1 runs suffered once.

Narrowest loss margins (by balls remaining)
Ireland has suffered loss off the last ball once.

Narrowest loss margins (by wickets)
Ireland has suffered defeat by 2 wickets thrice.

Tied matches 
A tie can occur when the scores of both teams are equal at the conclusion of play, provided that the side batting last has completed their innings. 
There have been 19 ties in T20Is history with Ireland involved in two such games.

Individual records

Batting records

Most career runs
A run is the basic means of scoring in cricket.
India's Virat Kohli has scored the most runs in T20Is followed by Rohit Sharma of India ahead of Martin Guptill from New Zealand in third with 2,536. Paul Stirling is the leading Irishmen on this list.

Most runs in each batting position

Highest individual score
The third T20I of the 2018 Zimbabwe Tri-Nation Series saw Aaron Finch score the highest Individual score. Kevin O'Brien, is not only the only Irish batsmen with centuries inn all three formats of the game, is also highest scorer for Ireland in T20Is.

Highest individual score – progression of record

Highest score against each opponent

Highest career average
A batsman's batting average is the total number of runs they have scored divided by the number of times they have been dismissed.

Highest Average in each batting position

Most half-centuries
A half-century is a score of between 50 and 99 runs. Statistically, once a batsman's score reaches 100, it is no longer considered a half-century but a century.

Virat Kohli of India has scored the most half-centuries in T20Is with 24. He is followed by India's Rohit Sharma on 21, Ireland's Paul Stirling on 18 and Australia's David Warner on 17.

Most centuries
A century is a score of 100 or more runs in a single innings.

Rohit Sharma has scored the most centuries in T20Is with 4.

Most Sixes

Most Fours

Highest strike rates
Ravija Sandaruwan of Kuwait holds the record for highest strike rate, with minimum 250 balls faced qualification, with 165.80. Gareth Delany is the Irishmen with the highest strike rate.

Highest strike rates in an inning
Dwayne Smith of West Indies strike rate of 414.28 during his 29 off 7 balls against Bangladesh during 2007 ICC World Twenty20 is the world record for highest strike rate in an innings. Kevin O'Brien during his innings of 42* of 16 balls against Netherlands during the 2014 ICC World Twenty20 is the leading Irishmen in this list. and Dinesh Karthik with his innings of 29* off 8 balls against Bangladesh in the final of the 2018 Nidahas Trophy against Bangladesh holds the top position for an Ireland player in this list.

Most runs in a calendar year
Paul Stirling of Ireland holds the Irish record for most runs scored in a calendar year with 748 runs scored in 2019.

Most runs in a series
The 2014 ICC World Twenty20 in Bangladesh saw Virat Kohli set the record for the most runs scored in a single series scoring 319 runs. He is followed by Tillakaratne Dilshan with 317 runs scored in the 2009 ICC World Twenty20. Stirling also holds the Irish record for most runs in a serie with 291 runs in the 2019 ICC Men's T20 World Cup Qualifier.

Most ducks
A duck refers to a batsman being dismissed without scoring a run. 
Tillakaratne Dilshan of Sri Lanka, Pakistan's Umar Akmal and Ireland's Kevin O'Brien has scored the equal highest number of ducks in T20Is with 10 such knocks.

Bowling records

Most career wickets
A bowler takes the wicket of a batsman when the form of dismissal is bowled, caught, leg before wicket, stumped or hit wicket. If the batsman is dismissed by run out, obstructing the field, handling the ball, hitting the ball twice or timed out the bowler does not receive credit.

Shakib Al Hasan is the highest wicket-taker in T20Is. George Dockrell is the highest ranked Irishmen bowler on the all-time.

Best figures in an innings
Bowling figures refers to the number of the wickets a bowler has taken and the number of runs conceded.
India's Deepak Chahar holds the world record for best figures in an innings when he took 6/7 against Bangladesh in November 2019 at Nagpur. Alex Cusack holds th Irish record with his spell of 4/11 against West Indies in February 2014 at Sabina Park in Kingston, Jamaica.

Best figures in an innings – progression of record

Best Bowling Figure against each opponent

Best career average
A bowler's bowling average is the total number of runs they have conceded divided by the number of wickets they have taken.
Afghanistan's Rashid Khan holds the record for the best career average in T20Is with 12.62. Ajantha Mendis, Sri Lankan cricketer, is second behind Rashid with an overall career average of 14.42 runs per wicket. Kevin O'Brien with an average of 19.55 is the highest ranked Irish bowler.

Best career economy rate
A bowler's economy rate is the total number of runs they have conceded divided by the number of overs they have bowled.
New Zealand's Daniel Vettori, holds the T20I record for the best career economy rate with 5.70. Trent Johnston, with a rate of 6.42 runs per over conceded is the highest Irishmen on the list.

Best career strike rate
A bowler's strike rate is the total number of balls they have bowled divided by the number of wickets they have taken.
The top bowler with the best T20I career strike rate is Rashid Khan of Afghanistan with strike rate of 12.3 balls per wicket. Kevin O'Brien is the Irish bowler with the lowest strike rate.

Most four-wickets (& over) hauls in an innings
Pakistan's Umar Gul has taken the most four-wickets (or over) among all the bowlers. Alex Cusack has taken three such hauls, the most for an Irish bowler.

Best economy rates in an inning
The best economy rate in an inning, when a minimum of 12 balls are delivered by the bowler, is Sri Lankan player Nuwan Kulasekara economy of 0.00 during his spell of 0 runs for 1 wicket in 2 overs against Netherlands at Zohur Ahmed Chowdhury Stadium in the 2014 ICC World Twenty20. Alex Cusack holds the Irish record during his spell in 2008 ICC World Twenty20 Qualifier against Kenya at Civil Service Cricket Club Ground, Belfast, Northern Ireland.

Best strike rates in an inning
The best strike rate in an inning, when a minimum of 4 wickets are taken by the player, is by Steve Tikolo of Kenya during his spell of 4/2 in 1.2 overs against Scotland during the 2013 ICC World Twenty20 Qualifier at ICC Academy, Dubai, UAE. Alex Cusack, Stuart Thompson and Mark Adair have the best streak rate among Irish bowler.

Worst figures in an innings
The worst figures in a T20I came in the Sri Lanka's tour of Australia when Kasun Rajitha of Sri Lanka had figures of 0/75 off his four overs at Adelaide Oval, Adelaide. The worst figures by an Irishmen is 0/69 that came off the bowling of Barry McCarthy in the 2017 tour of India against Afghanistan at Greater Noida Sports Complex Ground, Greater Noida, India.

Most runs conceded in a match
Kasun Rajitha also holds the dubious distinction of most runs conceded in a T20I during the aforementioned match. McCarthy in the above-mentioned spell holds the most runs conceded distinction for Ireland.

Most wickets in a calendar year
Nepal's Sandeep Lamichhane holds the record for most wickets taken in a year when he took 38 wickets in 2022 in 18 T20Is. Josh Little took 32 wickets in 2022, the most for an Irish bowler.

Most wickets in a series
2019 ICC World Twenty20 Qualifier at UAE saw records set for the most wickets taken by a bowler in a T20I series when Oman's pacer Bilal Khan tool 18 wickets during the series. Mark Adair in the same qualifier took 12 wickets, the most for an Irish bowler in a series.

Wicket-keeping records
The wicket-keeper is a specialist fielder who stands behind the stumps being guarded by the batsman on strike and is the only member of the fielding side allowed to wear gloves and leg pads.

Most career dismissals
A wicket-keeper can be credited with the dismissal of a batsman in two ways, caught or stumped. A fair catch is taken when the ball is caught fully within the field of play without it bouncing after the ball has touched the striker's bat or glove holding the bat, Laws 5.6.2.2 and 5.6.2.3 state that the hand or the glove holding the bat shall be regarded as the ball striking or touching the bat while a stumping occurs when the wicket-keeper puts down the wicket while the batsman is out of his ground and not attempting a run.
MS Dhoni heads the all-time list of taking most dismissals in T20Is as a designated wicket-keeper. Gary Wilson is the leading Irish wicket-keeper on this list.

Most career catches
Quinton de Kock heads the all-time list for most catches taken by the designated wicketkeeper. Gary Wilson is the leading Irish wicket-keeper on this list.

Most career stumpings
Dhoni also holds the record for most stumpings by a wicket-keeper. Niall O'Brien is the leading Irish wicket-keeper on this list

Most dismissals in an innings
Four wicket-keepers on four occasions have taken five dismissals in a single innings in a T20I.

The feat of taking 4 dismissals in an innings has been achieved by 19 wicket-keepers on 26 occasions with both Wilson and Niall O'Brien achieving it once each.

Most dismissals in a series
Netherlands wicket-keeper Scott Edwards holds the T20Is record for the most dismissals taken by a wicket-keeper in a series. He made 13 dismissals during the 2019 ICC World Twenty20 Qualifier. Gary Wilson in the same series affected eight dismissals, which is the most for an Irish wicket-keeper in a series.

Fielding records

Most career catches
Caught is one of the nine methods a batsman can be dismissed in cricket. The majority of catches are caught in the slips, located behind the batsman, next to the wicket-keeper, on the off side of the field. Most slip fielders are top order batsmen.

South Africa's David Miller holds the record for the most catches in T20Is by a non-wicket-keeper with 75, followed by New Zealand's Martin Guptill with 68. George Dockrell is the leading catcher for Ireland.

Most catches in an innings
The feat of taking 4 catches in an innings has been achieved by 14 fielders on 14 occasions. No Irishmen fielder has achieved this feat. The most is three catches on nine occasions.

Most catches in a series
The 2019 ICC Men's T20 World Cup Qualifier, which saw Netherlands retain their title, saw the record set for the most catches taken by a non-wicket-keeper in a T20I series. Jersey's Ben Stevens and Namibia's JJ Smit took 10 catches in the series. Kevin O'Brien in the same series took 8 catches, which is the most for an Irish fielder in a series.

Other records

Most career matches
India's Rohit Sharma holds the record for the most T20I matches played with 142. Paul Stirling is the most experienced Irish player, and is one of three players to have represented Ireland in more than 100 T20Is.

Most consecutive career matches
Scotland's Richie Berrington holds the record for the most consecutive T20I matches played with 74. Kevin O'Brien holds the Irishmen record.

Most matches as captain
MS Dhoni, who led the Indian cricket team from 2007 to 2016, holds the record for the most matches played as captain in T20Is with 72. William Porterfield holds the Irish record.

Youngest players on Debut
The youngest player to play in a T20I match is Marian Gherasim at the age of 14 years and 16 days. Making his debut for Romania against the Bulgaria on 16 October 2020 in the first T20I of the 2020 Balkan Cup thus becoming the youngest to play in a men's T20I match.

Oldest Players on Debut
The Turkish batsmen Osman Göker is the oldest player to make their debut a T20I match. Playing in the 2019 Continental Cup against Romania at Moara Vlasiei Cricket Ground, Moara Vlăsiei he was aged 59 years and 181 days.

Oldest Players
The Turkish batsmen Osman Göker is the oldest player to appear in a T20I match during the same above mentioned match.

Partnership records
In cricket, two batsmen are always present at the crease batting together in a partnership. This partnership will continue until one of them is dismissed, retires or the innings comes to a close.

Highest partnerships by wicket
A wicket partnership describes the number of runs scored before each wicket falls. The first wicket partnership is between the opening batsmen and continues until the first wicket falls. The second wicket partnership then commences between the not out batsman and the number three batsman. This partnership continues until the second wicket falls. The third wicket partnership then commences between the not out batsman and the new batsman. This continues down to the tenth wicket partnership. When the tenth wicket has fallen, there is no batsman left to partner so the innings is closed.

Highest partnerships by runs
The highest T20I partnership by runs for any wicket is held by the Afghan pairing of Hazratullah Zazai and Usman Ghani who put together an opening wicket partnership of 236 runs during the Ireland v Afghanistan series in India in 2019

Umpiring records

Most matches umpired
An umpire in cricket is a person who officiates the match according to the Laws of Cricket. Two umpires adjudicate the match on the field, whilst a third umpire has access to video replays, and a fourth umpire looks after the match balls and other duties. The records below are only for on-field umpires.

Ahsan Raza of Pakistan holds the record for the most T20I matches umpired with 49. The most experienced Irishmen umpire is Alan Neill with 15 matches officiated so far.

See also

List of Twenty20 International cricket records
List of Twenty20 International cricket hat-tricks
List of Test cricket records
List of One Day International cricket records
List of Ireland Test cricket records
List of Ireland One Day International cricket records

Notes

References

Twenty20 International cricket records and statistics